The 2012–13 Georgia State Panthers men's basketball team represented Georgia State University during the 2012–13 NCAA Division I men's basketball season. The team's head coach was Ron Hunter in his second season at GSU. They played their home games at the GSU Sports Arena and were members of the Colonial Athletic Association (CAA). This was their final year in the CAA before moving to the Sun Belt Conference. They finished the season 15–16, 10–8 in CAA play to finish in a tie for fifth place.

Season notes
This was the final season that the Panthers played in the Colonial Athletic Association. The 2013-14 season was played in the Sun Belt Conference.
Due to Georgia State's withdrawal from the CAA, the Men's Basketball team was ineligible for the CAA tournament (and therefore for the CAA's automatic bid to the NCAA tournament).
During the November 19 game against Monmouth, James Vincent tied GSU's total blocked shots in a game record at 9.
The game against Liberty on December 2 marked Coach Ron Hunter's 300th career win.
On February 2 during GSU's win against Old Dominion, freshman (and coaches son) R. J. Hunter broke the team record for 3 point goals made, setting the new record at 10. The previous record was 9. This also tied the CAA record for most 3 point field goals during a game. During the same game Hunter set a season high CAA record for points in a game at 38 points.
R. J. Hunter broke the freshman scoring record with 527 points for the season. The previous record was held by Matt O'Brien with 515 points.
By the final game of the season, junior Devonte White became the 17th player in school history to reach 1000 points.

Roster

Schedule

|-
!colspan=8| Exhibition

|-
!colspan=8| Regular Season

References

Georgia State Panthers men's basketball seasons
Georgia State
Georgia State Panthers men's basket
Georgia State Panthers men's basket